Furmanov is a town and the administrative center of Furmanovsky District in Ivanovo Oblast, Russia. Population:  It was previously known as Sereda (until March 13, 1941).

History
In 1918, it was incorporated as the town of Sereda. On March 13, 1941, it was renamed Furmanov after writer and Bolshevik Dmitry Furmanov.

Administrative and municipal status
Within the framework of administrative divisions, Furmanov serves as the administrative center of Furmanovsky District, to which it is directly subordinated. Prior to the adoption of the Law #145-OZ On the Administrative-Territorial Division of Ivanovo Oblast in December 2010, it used to be incorporated separately as an administrative unit with the status equal to that of the districts.

As a municipal division, the town of Furmanov is incorporated within Furmanovsky Municipal District as Furmanovskoye Urban Settlement.

International relations

Twin towns and sister cities
Furmanov is twinned with the town of Domodedovo in Moscow Oblast, Russia.

References

Notes

Sources

External links

Official website of Furmanov 
Furmanov Business Directory 

Cities and towns in Ivanovo Oblast
Nerekhtsky Uyezd